United Express is the brand name for the regional branch of United Airlines, under which six individually owned regional airlines operate short- and medium-haul feeder flights.

On October 1, 2010, UAL Corporation and Continental Airlines merged to form United Continental Holdings, the holding company for the newly merged United Airlines. On June 27, 2019, United Express changed its parent company name from United Continental Holdings to United Airlines Holdings. As of 2014, 555 aircraft fly under the United Express brand.

History

Major airlines in the United States had long maintained relationships with regional carriers which fed passengers from small markets to larger cities. The Airline Deregulation Act spurred industry consolidation both vertically and horizontally, and as the hub system became more pronounced, airlines formalized these relationships through code sharing, shared branding, and listing regional partners in computer reservations systems. On May 1, 1985, United formally partnered with Air Wisconsin, Horizon Air, and WestAir as United Express, feeding its hubs at Chicago–O'Hare, Seattle International Airport, and San Francisco International Airport. Aspen Airways soon joined the United Express system in 1986 feeding United's hub at Denver–Stapleton. Aspen was dismantled in 1990 being sold to Air Wisconsin and Mesa Airlines. Horizon Air was bought out by Alaska Airlines in 1987 at which time Horizon's contract as United Express was cancelled and a new carrier, North Pacific Airlines (NPA), was established by WestAir to service the Seattle hub as well as hubs at Portland, Spokane, and Boise. NPA was merged into its parent, WestAir, in 1991. San Juan Airlines of Seattle and SouthCentral Air of Anchorage, Alaska, also operated as United Express from 1987 through 1989. 

In 1988, Presidential Airways became a United Express carrier for United's new hub at Washington Dulles International Airport, but soon floundered. In response, WestAir formed an eastern division to serve Dulles. WestAir itself experienced turmoil; in 1991 it spun off the new division into an independent company, Atlantic Coast Airlines (ACA), which years later would go on to become Independence Air.

In 1990, Mesa Airlines took over all of the United Express routes from Denver formerly operated by Aspen Airways except the Denver to Aspen route which went to Air Wisconsin. Mesa also added a number of new routes from Denver as well. In 1992 Mesa created a new division called California Pacific Airlines to begin new United Express service from the Los Angeles hub. In 1995 Mesa took over all United Express routes at the Seattle and Portland hubs formerly operated by WestAir. Mesa Airlines contract operating as United Express was cancelled in 1998 at which time Air Wisconsin and Great Lakes Airlines took over the Denver routes while SkyWest took over the Los Angeles, Seattle, and Portland routes.  

In 1992, Great Lakes Airlines became a United Express partner, followed by Trans States Airlines the following year. In 1997, as United officially designated Los Angeles International Airport one of its hubs, SkyWest Airlines became a United Express partner as well. Great Lakes left the United Express system in early 2002, although it continued to do codeshare flights until they ceased operations in 2018.

In 1993, Trans States Airlines started United Feeder Service (UFS), to operate British Aerospace BAe ATP aircraft for United Airlines. The aircraft, originally owned by Air Wisconsin, were transferred and subsequently owned by United. UFS operated routes to Chicago O'Hare (ORD) from close markets in the U.S. Upper Midwest. UFS was eliminated from the United Express carrier network in 1999 and disappeared.

When United declared for Chapter 11 reorganization in 2002, it pressured its regional partners for reduced fees. In 2004, ACA canceled its contract and reinvented itself as low-cost carrier Independence Air. The next year, Air Wisconsin unsuccessfully bid to retain its flying contract, though it did retain some ground-handling United Express operations. To compensate, United initiated new service agreements with Colgan Air, Trans States subsidiary GoJet Airlines, and Republic Airways Holdings subsidiaries Chautauqua Airlines and Shuttle America. Mesa Airlines was also reinstated into the United Express system.

In 2005, United announced that service levels on major United Express routes would be upgraded to a new product called explus. Routes with explus service offer First Class seats and meal service on larger, 70-seat Embraer 170s and 66-seat Bombardier CRJ700s. Expanding the traditional regional partner role, United started to use the airplanes configured with explus amenities instead of, or alongside with, mainline jets on routes linking large cities, such as Chicago to Houston.

United announced a new Express focus city at San Antonio International Airport in 2006, but the experiment was short-lived. Trans States was the carrier operating the San Antonio operation.

United decided to cancel Dash 8 and CRJ200 service with Mesa Airlines in November 2009. On November 16, 2009 it was announced that ExpressJet would begin operating Embraer ERJ145 beginning in the spring of 2010. Mesa Airlines continued service using CRJ700 regional jets and added the Embraer 175 in 2015.

All Continental Express and Continental Connection service officially merged into United Express in late 2011 including that of Cape Air which was operating as Continental Connection on behalf of Continental Micronesia in Guam. Silver Airways was also a Continental Connection carrier that converted to United Express using turbo prop aircraft. Silver operated throughout Florida as well as routes from Washington Dulles Airport however their affiliation as United Express ended in 2013. 

On April 1, 2012, Pinnacle Airlines Corp. filed for bankruptcy and announced it would draw down its Colgan Air operation. In May, United reached a deal with Republic Airways Holdings for its subsidiary Republic Airways to fly the Q400 in Colgan's place. The eight-year capacity purchase agreement included all 28 aircraft previously operated by Colgan as well as four currently flown by Republic for Frontier Airlines.

In August 2015, United announced the start of a new subsidiary, United Ground Express, to provide ground operation service in select airports within its domestic network.

By September 2016, Republic Airways Q400s were phased out of service, replacing them with 50 more Embraer 175s.

On February 27, 2017, United Airlines announced the return of their partnership with Air Wisconsin as a United Express carrier. They would be flying a fleet of 65 Bombardier CRJ200 beginning second-half 2017.

In September 2017, the Q300 was phased out and in January 2018, the Q200 was phased out. These were the final prop aircraft in the United Express system within the United States.

On April 16, 2018, United Airlines announced the end of its partnership with Cape Air. Services ended on May 31, 2018, which marked the end of United Express operations in Guam, along with the retirement of the last turboprop aircraft in the United Express fleet.

In March 2020, during the COVID-19 pandemic, Trans States Airlines announced that it would be ceasing operations on April 1, 2020, ending its operations as United Express.

On July 30, 2020, it was announced that United Airlines had decided to end its contract with ExpressJet and transferred these operations to CommuteAir. ExpressJet continued its operations until September 30, 2020 and CommuteAir became the sole operator of the United Express Embraer ERJ145 fleet.

As of 2022, six airlines remain as United Express feeder carriers: Air Wisconsin, CommuteAir, GoJet, Mesa Airlines, Republic Airways, and SkyWest Airlines. Most of these carriers now have routes spanning the entire United States with regional jets. SkyWest serves a number of small cities that are subsidized by the federally funded Essential Air Service program as well as other local and state governments.

Destinations

Bus service 
United Express bus service connects Beaumont/Port Arthur to George Bush Intercontinental Airport (IAH). This service began after Colgan Air-operated Saab 340 turboprop flights ended on July 1, 2012, and this bus service continues at present with several trips a day.

United Express also has a bus service from Lehigh Valley International Airport (ABE) near Allentown, Pennsylvania to Newark Liberty International Airport (EWR). Continental Airlines, which later merged into United, previously operated flights from Allentown to Newark but switched to a bus service in 1995 due to constant delays from air traffic control. By February 2010 the bus was the only form of service offered by Continental after it cancelled its Allentown to Cleveland Hopkins Airport flights.

Operators and fleet

Fleet
The combined United Express branded fleet consists of the following regional aircraft as of December 2022:

Historical regional jet fleet
The United Express brand, through its various regional and commuter airline partners, operated a variety of jet aircraft over the years including the following types:

 BAe 146-100
 BAe 146-200
 BAe 146-300
 Bombardier CRJ100
 Dornier 328JET
 Embraer ERJ135

Historical turboprop fleet
The United Express brand, through its various regional and commuter airline partners, operated a variety of twin turboprop aircraft over the years including the following types:

 ATR 42
 BAe ATP
 BAe Jetstream 31
 BAe Jetstream 32
 BAe Jetstream 41
 Beechcraft 1900C
 Beechcraft 1900D
 Beechcraft Super King Air (Beechcraft 1300 Model)
 Bombardier Q200
 Bombardier Q300
 Bombardier Q400
 de Havilland Canada Dash 8-100
 Dornier 328
 Embraer EMB-110
 Embraer EMB-120
 Fokker F27
 Saab 340
 Short 360

Accidents and incidents
 On February 2, 1988, United Express flight 3749 from Denver to Durango, CO, operated by Aspen Airways using a Convair 580 aircraft, drifted off a snow-packed runway at night while landing at Durango-La Plata County Airport and crashed into a snowbank. No injuries were reported among the 38 passengers and three crew members on-board.
 On December 26, 1989, United Express Flight 2415 operated by North Pacific Airlines, a BAe Jetstream 31 crashed on approach to Tri-Cities Airport near Pasco, Washington. The four passengers and two crew members on board were killed. The crew executed an excessively steep and unstabilized instrument landing system (ILS) approach. That approach, along with improper air traffic control commands and aircraft icing, caused the aircraft to stall and crash short of the runway.
 On January 7, 1994, United Express Flight 6291 operated by Atlantic Coast Airlines, a BAe Jetstream 41 crashed on approach to Port Columbus International Airport. Two passengers and three crew members were killed, while three passengers (a Taiwanese family) survived the accident. The NTSB report concluded the aircraft was never properly stabilized for the approach to runway 28L. The aircraft slowed to a stall, which was not recognized by the flight crew in a timely manner. The subsequent stall recovery was performed contrary to the Airplane Flight Manual procedure, which resulted in the aircraft impacting the ground less than 2 miles from the runway. Furthermore, after investigating the backgrounds of the cockpit crew, the NTSB concluded that Atlantic Coast shouldn't have paired an inexperienced first officer with a captain who had a history of failed check rides.
 On November 19, 1996, United Express Flight 5925 operated by Great Lakes Airlines, a Beechcraft 1900C collided with a King Air during landing at Quincy Regional Airport. The ten passengers and two crew members on board were killed. The pilots of the King Air were blamed for failing to effectively monitor both the common frequency and to scan for traffic.
 On April 9, 2017, passenger Dr. David Dao was dragged off of United Express Flight 3411 by law enforcement. He had been selected to be deplaned to make room for deadheading crew, but had refused to give up his seat, stating that he needed to see patients the following day. He suffered a concussion, lost teeth, and a broken nose.
 On March 4, 2019, United Express Flight 4933 operated by CommuteAir, a Embraer EMB-145XR, landed in a snow-covered grassy area to the right of the runway at Presque Isle International Airport and was severely damaged; two passengers and the first officer suffered minor injuries. The accident was attributed to an inadequately reported ILS misalignment combined with "confirmation bias" and fatigue that led the first officer to continue the approach despite being unable to see the runway due to blowing snow.

References

External links 

 United's official United Express page
 United's official United Express Fleet page

United Airlines
Regional airline brands
Companies that filed for Chapter 11 bankruptcy in 2002